Louis Alexander Novikoff (October 12, 1915 – September 30, 1970), nicknamed "The Mad Russian," was an American professional baseball player. Born in Glendale, Arizona, his professional career extended from 1937 to 1950, with all or parts of five seasons in Major League Baseball for the Chicago Cubs (1941–44) and Philadelphia Phillies (1946).

Career
Novikoff batted over .350 in each of his first five minor league seasons. In 1940, playing for the top-level Los Angeles Angels of the Pacific Coast League, he batted .363 with 259 hits, including 41 home runs. He is a 2015 inductee in the Pacific Coast League Hall of Fame.

His best year in the major leagues was 1942, when he played nearly a full season and batted .300 as a Cubs outfielder during the first of the World War II years, when the player ranks were thinned by the draft. Altogether, as a big-leaguer he batted .282 with 305 hits, with 45 doubles, ten triples and 15 home runs.
 
Because of his eccentric personality, the media dubbed him "The Mad Russian," after a popular radio character of the same name played by Bert Gordon. According to Warren Brown's history of the Cubs (written after the 1945 season, when Novikoff had been recently active with the team), Novikoff was afraid to approach the ivy on the Wrigley Field walls, fearing that it was poison ivy, thus diminishing his usefulness as an outfielder at the time, however Cubs trainer Bob Lewis took Novikoff to the vines one day and rubbed them all over his body and chewed some up proving they were safe.  Novikoff smiled politely afterwards and asked if they could be smoked.

References

External links

1915 births
1970 deaths
American people of Russian descent
Sportspeople from Glendale, Arizona
Baseball players from Arizona
Chicago Cubs players
Houston Buffaloes players
Los Angeles Angels (minor league) players
Major League Baseball left fielders
Milwaukee Brewers (minor league) players
Moline Plowboys players
Newark Bears (IL) players
Philadelphia Phillies players
Ponca City Angels players
Seattle Rainiers players
Tulsa Oilers (baseball) players
Victoria Athletics players
Yakima Bears players